The 641st Aircraft Control and Warning Squadron is an inactive United States Air Force unit. It was last assigned to the 21st Air Division (ADTAC), Tactical Air Command, stationed at Melville Air Station, Newfoundland and Labrador, Canada (site N-24, later C-24). It was inactivated on 30 June 1971.

The unit was a General Surveillance Radar squadron providing for the air defense of North America.

Lineage
 Established as the 641st Aircraft Control and Warning Squadron, 1 August 1953
 Activated 1 August 1953
 Inactivated 30 June 1971

Assignments
 64th Air Division, 1 August 1953
 4732d Air Defense Group, 1 April 1957
 Goose Air Defense Sector, 1 April 1960
 37th Air Division, 1 April 1966
 21st Air Division, 31 March 1970 – 30 June 1971

Stations
 Goose AFB, Labrador, 1 August 1953
 Melville Air Station, Labrador, 1 November 1957 – 30 June 1971

References

  Cornett, Lloyd H. and Johnson, Mildred W., A Handbook of Aerospace Defense Organization  1946 - 1980, Office of History, Aerospace Defense Center, Peterson AFB, CO (1980)

External links

Radar squadrons of the United States Air Force
Aerospace Defense Command units